USS Nathaniel Taylor was a Union schooner.

 captured the schooner, Nathaniel Taylor, in the Pasquotank River, North Carolina, 8 April 1863.

Assigned to the stone fleet 

Although the schooner was not sent north for adjudication, the Union Navy purchased her from the New York City prize court 19 May 1863, and she was sunk as an obstruction at Petit Bois Channel.

See also

Union Blockade

References 

Ships of the Union Navy
Schooners of the United States Navy
Ships of the Stone Fleet